Test Valley Arts Foundation (TVAF) is an independent grant giving charity established in 1991 by Michael Colvin MP with help from TESCO and Test Valley Borough Council.  Since its inception TVAF has distributed some £75,000 in grants, awards, bursaries and underwriting to individual artists and arts organisations throughout the Test Valley.

In addition to helping groups and organisations, the foundation seeks to encourage and assist the development of talented individuals resident in the borough of Test Valley.

External links
Official web site

Arts organisations based in the United Kingdom
Test Valley
Arts organizations established in 1991
1991 establishments in the United Kingdom